Diego Antonio Gavilán Zarate (born 1 March 1980) is a Paraguayan former footballer and current coach. He is the current interim manager of Cerro Porteño's reserve team.

Career
Gavilán's nickname pampero – literally meaning the horse or the man that runs like the wind in the Pampa – offers a fair indication of his purposeful and hard-running style. He began his top-flight career at Cerro Porteño and he became the first-ever Paraguayan to play in England, when he signed for Newcastle United in 2000.

Newcastle United
Gavilan signed with the club in January 2000. On the eve of playing the 2000 Pre-Olympic CONMEBOL Tournament, was surprised by being transferred to Newcastle United, attending a meeting on one and then signing a contract the next day. Gavilán did not participate in the Pre-Olympic Tournament and went directly to his new club. Upon joining from Cerro Porteño, Gavilan was labelled Paraguay's David Beckham. Gavilán already studied English whilst in High School in Paraguay, but had to take classes twice a week once he was in Newcastle to improve his English.

Gavilán cost Newcastle £2m when he left his native Paraguay behind at the age of just 19. He made his Premiership debut in a 2–2 draw at Sunderland. He struggled however, to stake a real claim for a first team place, making some appearances for the club as a substitute. He scored once in the league, against Coventry in a 2–0 win in April 2000.

Gavilan mentioned the difference between English and Paraguayan football and the physicality in the Premier League, that he was tackled hardly by Jaap Stam in his first game against Manchester United.

In December 2001, it was announced that Newcastle would loan out Gavilan to Mexican club Universidad Autonoma de Guadalajara for the remainder of the 2001/02 season. His last first-team appearance fifteen months prior to this was in a League Cup victory over Leyton Orient, and by this time he had played only two further games for the club.

In 2003, he joined Internacional of Brazil.

Gavilan later revealed that Gary Speed was like a father to him, praising Speed for helping him settle into life at St. James' Park and for also congratulating Gavilan when he was selected for Paraguay's squad for the 2002 FIFA World Cup.

Newell's Old Boys
In 2006, Gavilán signed with the Argentinian side Newell's Old Boys.

Gremio
He signed the following year with Grêmio, returning to the city of Porto Alegre in Brazil.

Independiente
Gavilán then joined Independiente on loan.

Portuguesa
Then with Portuguesa until November.

Independiente CG
In 2011, the players signs with Independiente CG.

Coaching career
Gavilán coached Cerro Porteño U15 as of 2013. He coached Sergio Díaz.

In May 2015, Gavilán was announced as coach of Independiente Campo Grande in Paraguay's Division Intermedia, second division.

References

External links

Diego Gavilán – Argentine Primera Statistics at Fútbol XXI 

1980 births
Living people
2002 FIFA World Cup players
2006 FIFA World Cup players
Associação Portuguesa de Desportos players
Cerro Porteño players
Club Olimpia footballers
CR Flamengo footballers
Grêmio Foot-Ball Porto Alegrense players
1999 Copa América players
Tecos F.C. footballers
Expatriate footballers in Argentina
Expatriate footballers in Brazil
Expatriate footballers in England
Expatriate footballers in Italy
Newcastle United F.C. players
Newell's Old Boys footballers
Club Atlético Independiente footballers
Paraguayan footballers
Paraguay international footballers
Paraguayan expatriates in Italy
Paraguayan people of Spanish descent
Premier League players
Sport Club Internacional players
Udinese Calcio players
Argentine Primera División players
Serie A players
Sportspeople from Asunción
Association football midfielders
Paraguayan football managers
Paraguayan expatriates in England
Esporte Clube Pelotas managers
Club Sol de América managers
Deportivo Capiatá managers
Independiente F.B.C. managers
Cerro Porteño managers